Syagrus stratincola is a species of flowering plant in the family Arecaceae. It is found in French Guiana, Guyana, and Suriname. It is threatened by habitat loss.

References

stratincola
Palms of French Guiana
Flora of Guyana
Flora of Suriname
Vulnerable flora of South America
Taxonomy articles created by Polbot